Joe Byler (August 25, 1922 – May 5, 1994) was an American football tackle. He played for the New York Giants in 1946.

References

1922 births
1994 deaths
American football tackles
Nebraska Cornhuskers football players
New York Giants players